Valeriy Gluhov is a Russian mountain bike orienteer. He won a gold medal in the relay at the 2010 World MTB Orienteering Championships, together with Ruslan Gritsan and Anton Foliforov, and placed fifth in the middle distance.

References

Russian orienteers
Male orienteers
Russian male cyclists
Mountain bike orienteers
Living people
Place of birth missing (living people)
Year of birth missing (living people)
21st-century Russian people